Buerton is a former civil parish, now in the parish of Aldford and Saighton, in the unitary authority of Cheshire West and Chester and the ceremonial county of Cheshire, England. According to the 2001 census it had a population of 22. The civil parish was abolished in 2015 to form Aldford and Saighton.

See also

 Listed buildings in Buerton, Cheshire West and Chester

References

Former civil parishes in Cheshire
Cheshire West and Chester